The Centaurus was the final development of the Bristol Engine Company's series of sleeve valve radial aircraft engines. The engine was introduced into service late in the Second World War and was one of the most powerful aircraft piston engines to see service.

Design and development

Like other Bristol sleeve valve engines, the Centaurus was based on the design knowledge acquired from an earlier design, in this case the Bristol Perseus cylinder. The Centaurus used 18 Perseus cylinders.   The same cylinder was in use in the contemporary 14-cylinder Hercules, which was being brought into production when the design of the Centaurus started.

The diameter of the Centaurus was only just over 6 percent greater than the Hercules in spite of its much greater swept volume.

The cylinder heads had an indentation like an inverted top hat, which was finned, but it was difficult to get air down into this hollow to adequately cool the head. During development, Bristol contacted ICI Metals Division, Birmingham, to enquire whether a copper-chromium alloy with higher thermal conductivity would have sufficient high temperature strength to be used for this purpose.

Bristol maintained the Centaurus from type-testing in 1938, but production did not start until 1942, owing to the need to get the Hercules into production and improve the reliability of the entire engine line.

The Centaurus did not enter service until near the end of the war, first appearing on the Vickers Warwick. Other wartime, or postwar, uses included the Bristol Brigand and Buckmaster, Hawker Tempest and Sea Fury and the Blackburn Firebrand and Beverley. The engine also entered service after the war in a civilian airliner, the Airspeed Ambassador and was also used in the Bristol Brabazon I Mark 1 prototype aircraft until the Brabazon trans-Atlantic airliner programme was cancelled. The eight Centaurus engines were to be replaced with eight Bristol Proteus gas turbines on the Mark II giving a 100 mph faster cruising speed at 10,000 ft higher altitude. By the end of the war in Europe, around 2,500 examples of the Centaurus had been produced by Bristol.

The 373 was the most powerful version of the Centaurus and was intended for the Blackburn Beverley transport aircraft. Using direct fuel injection, it achieved a remarkable , but was never fitted. A projected enlarged capacity version of the Centaurus was designed by Sir Roy Fedden; cylinders were produced for this engine, but it was never built. Known as the Bristol Orion, a name used previously for a variant of the Jupiter engine and  later re-used for a turboprop, this development was also a two-row, 18 cylinder sleeve valve engine, with the displacement increased to }, nearly as large as the American Pratt & Whitney R-4360 Wasp Major four-row, 28-cylinder radial, the largest displacement aviation radial engine ever placed in quantity production.

Variants
The Centaurus was produced in 34 variants, ranging from the  Centaurus I to the final  Centaurus 663 for the Airspeed Ambassador airliner. The most powerful variants to enter service were the  Centaurus 170, 173, 660, 661 and 662.

Applications

Note:

Survivors
The Royal Navy Historic Flight operated a Hawker Sea Fury powered by a Bristol Centaurus engine until it was destroyed in an accident on 28 April 2021 whist attempting a forced landing following a failure and seizure of its Bristol Centaurus XVIII engine:

https://assets.publishing.service.gov.uk/media/628cd96cd3bf7f1f47c65ebc/Hawker_Sea_Fury_T_Mk_20_G-RNHF_07-22.pdf

Engines on display
Preserved Bristol Centaurus engines are on public display at the following museums:
Aerospace Bristol
Aerospace Museum of California
Fleet Air Arm Museum
Imperial War Museum Duxford
London Science Museum
Midland Air Museum
Shuttleworth Collection, Old Warden
Dumfries and Galloway Aviation Museum
San Diego Air & Space Museum

Specifications (Centaurus VII)

See also

References

Notes

Bibliography
Bridgman, L, (ed.) (1998) Jane's Fighting Aircraft of World War II. Crescent.  
Gunston, Bill. Development of Piston Aero Engines. Cambridge, UK. Patrick Stephens, 2006. 
Gunston, Bill. World Encyclopedia of Aero Engines: From the Pioneers to the Present Day. 5th edition, Stroud, UK: Sutton, 2006.
Lumsden, Alec. British Piston Engines and Their Aircraft. Marlborough, UK: Airlife Publishing, 2003. .
White, Graham. Allied Aircraft Piston Engines of World War II: History and Development of Frontline Aircraft Piston Engines Produced by Great Britain and the United States During World War II. Warrendale, Pennsylvania: SAE International, 1995.

External links

Period advertisement for the Bristol Centaurus - Flight, May 1949
Video of a cutaway engine in motion illustrating its operation

Aircraft air-cooled radial piston engines
Centaurus
Sleeve valve engines
1930s aircraft piston engines